"Silence" is a song by Belgian singer Stromae, released on his album Cheese (2010). The song has charted in Belgium.

Charts

References

External links
 

2010 singles
2010 songs
Stromae songs
Eurodance songs
Songs written by Stromae